Vladimir Nikolaevich Sakhnov (born April 25, 1961 in Kamenka, Tselinograd Oblast, Kazakh SSR) is a former Soviet cross-country skier who raced from 1983 to 1989. Sakhnov trained at Armed Forces sports society in Alma-Ata. He earned a silver medal in the 4 × 10 km relay at the 1988 Winter Olympics in Calgary; his best individual Winter Olympics finish was a fourth in the 30 km event in 1984.

Sakhnov also won a silver medal in the 4 × 10 km relay at the 1987 FIS Nordic World Ski Championships. His best individual finish at the Nordic skiing World Championships was a sixth place in the 50 km event at those same championships.

Sakhnov's best career finish was second in two World Cup events (1984. 1986).

Cross-country skiing results
All results are sourced from the International Ski Federation (FIS).

Olympic Games
 1 medal – (1 silver)

World Championships
 1 medal – (1 silver)

World Cup

Season standings

Individual podiums

2 podiums

Team podiums

 1 victory 
 5 podiums 

Note:  Until the 1999 World Championships and the 1994 Winter Olympics, World Championship and Olympic races were included in the World Cup scoring system.

References

External links
 
 Biography 
 
 

Russian male cross-country skiers
Soviet male cross-country skiers
1961 births
Cross-country skiers at the 1984 Winter Olympics
Cross-country skiers at the 1988 Winter Olympics
Living people
Olympic medalists in cross-country skiing
FIS Nordic World Ski Championships medalists in cross-country skiing
Medalists at the 1988 Winter Olympics
Olympic silver medalists for the Soviet Union
Olympic cross-country skiers of the Soviet Union